Carnival Films is a British production company based in London, UK, founded in 1978. It has produced television series for all the major UK networks including the BBC, ITV, Channel 4, and Sky, as well as international broadcasters including PBS, A&E, HBO and NBC. Productions include single dramas, long-running television dramas, feature films, and stage productions.

History
Carnival Films was founded in 1978 by feature film producer Brian Eastman.

As of 2014, Carnival has produced over 500 hours of drama and comedy for television, cinema and stage. This included 70 episodes of Agatha Christie's Poirot starring David Suchet and 22 episodes of Rosemary & Thyme, starring Felicity Kendal and Pam Ferris. In the action/adventure genre it produced BUGS, Oktober and The Grid, in comedy drama it produced Jeeves and Wooster starring Hugh Laurie and Stephen Fry, teenage drama-comedy As If, as well as the adaptations of Tom Sharpe's novels Blott on the Landscape and Porterhouse Blue.

In 2004, the BBC's former Head of Drama Commissioning Gareth Neame joined Carnival as managing director. In 2007, former Creative Director of BBC Drama Sally Woodward Gentle joined the company as Creative Director. The two had previously worked together on Spooks (MI:5), Tipping the Velvet and Cambridge Spies.

In 2008, Carnival was acquired by NBCUniversal as part of its plan to increase its presence in content creation outside the United States. Following several more acquisitions Carnival is now part of NBCUniversal International Television Production alongside newer additions Monkey Kingdom, Working Title Television, Chocolate Media and Lucky Giant in the UK, Lark in Canada and Matchbox Pictures in Australia.

Under the direction of Gareth Neame, Carnival has produced series such as; The Philanthropist for NBC; hit BBC series Hotel Babylon; the television films Enid starring Helena Bonham Carter and Matthew Macfadyen; Page Eight starring Bill Nighy, Rachel Weisz, Michael Gambon and Ralph Fiennes; four-part drama Any Human Heart starring Jim Broadbent, Matthew MacFadyen, Hayley Atwell and Kim Cattrall; The Hollow Crown, a BBC adaptation of Shakespeare's history plays starring Tom Hiddleston, Ben Whishaw and Jeremy Irons; The Last Weekend, a three-part adaptation of Blake Morrison's novel; and Whitechapel for ITV.

Carnival's biggest hit, both critically and commercially, is Downton Abbey, written and co-produced by Julian Fellowes. The final episode of the TV series aired on 25 December 2015. In 2016, Neame and Fellowes started planning a feature adaptation; it was officially confirmed in July 2018 and filming began later that month. Downton Abbey (film) was released in the United Kingdom on 13 September 2019 by Universal Pictures, and in the United States on 20 September 2019 by Focus Features. It received generally positive reviews from critics and grossed $194 million worldwide. The sequel, Downton Abbey: A New Era, was released in the United Kingdom on 29 April 2022, and in the United States on 20 May 2022.

Productions

Television

Current
The Last Kingdom

Past
2006–present (as Carnival Film and Television Ltd.)
Belgravia (2020) One series for ITV1 / Epix – total 6 episodes
Stan Lee's Lucky Man (2016–2019) Three series for Sky One – total 28 episodes
The Hollow Crown (2012–2016) 8 episodes for BBC Two
Jamestown (2017–2019 ) Three series for Sky One – total 24 episodes
Downton Abbey (2010–2015) Six series for ITV1 – total 52 episodes
The Lost Honour of Christopher Jefferies (2014) Mini Series for ITV1 – total 2 episodes
Dracula (2013/2014) One series for Sky Living / NBC – total 10 episodes
Salting the Battlefield (2014) Single Drama for BBC Two (Part 3 of The Worricker Trilogy)
Turks & Caicos (2014) Single Drama for BBC Two (Part 2 of The Worricker Trilogy)
The 7.39 (2014) Mini Series for BBC One – total 2 episodes
Whitechapel (2009–2013) Four series for ITV1 – total 18 episodes
Murder on the Home Front (2013) Mini Series for ITV1 – total 2 episodes
The Last Weekend (2012) Mini Series for ITV1 – total 3 episodes
Page Eight (2011) Single Drama for BBC Two (Part 1 of The Worricker Trilogy)
Any Human Heart (2010) Miniseries for Channel 4 – total 4 episodes
Material Girl (2010) One series for BBC One – total 6 episodes
Enid (2009) Single Drama for BBC Four
Hotel Babylon (2006–2009) Four series for BBC One – total 32 episodes
The Philanthropist (2009) One series for NBC – total 8 episodes
Harley Street (2008) One series for ITV1 – total 6 episodes
Midnight Man (2008) Mini Series for ITV1 – total 3 episodes
The Old Curiosity Shop (2007) Single Drama for ITV1/WGBH
Christmas at the Riviera (2007) Single Drama for ITV1
Empathy (2007) Single Drama for BBC One
Sea of Souls: The Prayer Tree (2007) Mini Series for BBC One – total 2 episodes
The Whistleblowers (2007) One series for ITV1 – total 6 episodes
Rosemary & Thyme (2003–2006) Three series for ITV1 – total 22 episodes

1989–2005 (as Carnival Film and Theatre Ltd.)
The Grid: Mini series (2004) for BBC and TNT – total 2 episodes
Agatha Christie's Poirot: (1989–2004) for ITV1 – total 53 episodes
As If: four series (2001–2004) for Channel 4 – total 60 episodes
As If (US): one series (2002) for UPN – total 7 episodes
The 10th Kingdom: Mini Series (2000) for NBC – total 9 episodesLucy Sullivan Is Getting Married: two series (1999–2000) for ITV1 – total 16 episodesOktober: Mini Series (1998) for ITV1 – total three episodesBUGS: four series (1995–1998) for BBC One – total 40 episodesCrime Traveller: one series (1997) for BBC One – total 8 episodesThe Mill on the Floss: TV Film (1997) for BBCOne/WGBH/Canal PlusThe Fragile Heart: Mini Series (1996) for Channel 4 – total 3 episodesThe Infiltrator: TV Film (1995) for HBOAnna Lee: one series (1994) for ITV – total 5 episodesJeeves and Wooster: four series (1990–1993) for Granada/ ITV – total 23 episodesAll or Nothing at All: Mini Series (1993) for LWT/ ITV – total 3 episodesHead over Heels: one series (1993) for Carlton/ITV – total 7 episodesThe Big Battalions: Mini Series (1992) for Channel 4 – total 5 episodesTraffik: TV Film (1989) for Channel 4Forever Green: two series (1989–1992) for LWT/ ITV – total 18 episodes

1978–1988 (as Picture Partnership Productions Ltd.)Porterhouse Blue: Mini Series (1987) for Channel 4 – total 4 episodesBlott on the Landscape: Mini Series (1985) for BBC – total 6 episodesFather's Day: two series (1983–1984) – total 14 episodes

FilmDownton Abbey: A New Era (2022)Downton Abbey (2019)Firelight (1997)Up on the Roof (1997)Shadowlands (1993)Under Suspicion (1991)Wilt (1990)

1978–1988 (as Picture Partnership Productions Ltd.)Whoops Apocalypse! (1988)Cry Wolf (1980)

Stage
PastJuno and the Paycock  (1993) Albery Theatre, LondonHow Was It for You? Theatre Royal, PlymouthMap of the Heart (1991) Globe Theatre, LondonThe Ghost Train (1992) Lyric Theatre, LondonWhat a Performance (1994) Queens Theatre, LondonMisery (1992) Criterion Theatre, LondonShadowlands (1990) Brooks Atkinson Theatre, New YorkUp on the Roof'' (1987)

Awards
Carnival Films has won a wide variety of awards for its work on Television, Film and Stage productions. With the company itself winning the 'Best Independent Production Company' award at both the Televisual Magazine Bulldog Awards 2011, and the Broadcast Awards 2012.
In addition Carnival's productions have together been awarded nine Primetime Emmy Awards; one Golden Globe; nineteen BAFTAs; one Screen Actors Guild Award; a Producers Guild of America Award; two National Television Award; three International Emmy Awards; five RTS awards; four BANFF Rockie Awards; three Ivor Novello Awards; two Broadcast awards; a Bulldog award; an Evening Standard Theatre Award; and a Tony.

Further to this success the company's productions have also received nominations from such varied awards bodies as the Academy Awards, the Laurence Olivier Awards, The Monte Carlo International Television Festival, The Screen Actors Guild, The American Society of Cinematographers, The Edgar Allan Poe Awards, The Rose D’Or and The San Sebastian Film Festival.

References

External links

Mass media companies established in 1978
NBCUniversal
Television production companies of the United Kingdom
British companies established in 1978
2008 mergers and acquisitions
British subsidiaries of foreign companies
Mass media companies based in London